The Searunner 37 is a trimaran sailboat designed by Jim Brown in the 1960s. It is the second largest boat in the Searunner series, the largest being the Searunner 40.

Reception

See also
List of multihulls
Jim Brown
Searunner 25
Searunner 31
Searunner 40

References

Trimarans